Santa María del Lago is a wetland, part of the Wetlands of Bogotá, located in the locality Engativá, Bogotá, Colombia.

Flora and fauna

Insects 
The dragonfly species Ischnura cruzi has been registered in Santa María del Lago, as well as in La Conejera and La Florida.

Birds 
Santa María del Lago hosts 43 bird species.

See also 

Biodiversity of Colombia, Bogotá savanna, Thomas van der Hammen Natural Reserve
Wetlands of Bogotá

References

Bibliography

External links 
  Fundación Humedales de Bogotá
  Conozca los 15 humedales de Bogotá - El Tiempo

Wetlands of Bogotá